Your Favorite Story is a syndicated TV anthology series that was broadcast in the United States from 1953 to 1955. The program was also known as My Favorite Story. It was premiered in December 1954 with the title Your Favorite Playhouse.

This program was adapted from the radio show Favorite Story which ran from 1946 to 1949. The program's 25 episodes were hosted and narrated by Adolphe Menjou, who also acted in several episodes. It featured episodes originally written by Leonard St. Clair, William Makepeace Thackeray, Mary Roberts Rinehart and Frank R. Stockton.

The show was produced by Ziv Television Programs. John Guillermin directed some episodes.

The program's initial episode was an adaptation of Leo Tolstoy's "How Much Land Does a Man Need?", directed by Eddie Davis and starring Raymond Burr.

References

External links 
Your Favorite Story at CVTA with episode list
 
 TV.com: Your Favorite Story

1950s American comedy television series
1950s American anthology television series
1953 American television series debuts
1955 American television series endings
NBC original programming
Black-and-white American television shows
English-language television shows